Robert Simms may refer to:

 Robert D. Simms (1926–2008), Justice of the Oklahoma Supreme Court
 Robert Simms (politician) (born 1984), Australian politician
 Robert Simms (United Irishmen) (1761–1843), Irish radical
 Robert Simms (the younger) (before 1821–after 1843), son of the Irish radical, one of the founders of the Belfast Natural History Society

See also
Robert Sims (fl. 2010s), lyric baritone
Robert Syms (born 1956), English Conservative Party politician
Robert Symms (1931–2014), American photographer